Lucas de Souza Gonçalves (born 13 June 1991), commonly known as Lucas Gaúcho, is a Brazilian professional footballer who plays as a striker for Al-Qadsia.

Career

Brazil career
Lucas began his career on São Paulo youth categories. On 24 February 2011, he was loaned to São Bernardo, in a three-month deal.

In June, he signed with Portuguesa.

After six months in Lusa, his contract was rescinded.

RCD Espanyol
After the rescision, Lucas signed a 4-and-a-half contract with La Liga club Espanyol Barcelona, according to his Twitter.

BEC Tero Sasana
On 14 August 2013, he is first scored debut in match against TOT S.C. before won over 0-5.

National career
He played for youth  national teams under 18,19,20.

Club career statistics

Honours
Portuguesa
Campeonato Brasileiro Série B: 2011

References

External links
 Lucas Gaúcho at Goal.com
 
 
 
 

1991 births
Living people
Sportspeople from Rio Grande do Sul
Brazilian footballers
Brazilian expatriate footballers
Association football forwards
São Paulo FC players
São Bernardo Futebol Clube players
Associação Portuguesa de Desportos players
RCD Espanyol footballers
Luverdense Esporte Clube players
Esporte Clube São José players
Lucas Gaucho
Al-Shabab SC (Seeb) players
FK Žalgiris players
Thespakusatsu Gunma players
Bnei Sakhnin F.C. players
Campeonato Brasileiro Série A players
Campeonato Brasileiro Série B players
Lucas Gaucho
Oman Professional League players
A Lyga players
J2 League players
Qadsia SC players
C.D. Jorge Wilstermann players
Israeli Premier League players
Expatriate footballers in Bolivia
Expatriate footballers in Spain
Brazilian expatriate sportspeople in Spain
Expatriate footballers in Thailand
Brazilian expatriate sportspeople in Thailand
Expatriate footballers in Vietnam
Brazilian expatriate sportspeople in Vietnam
Expatriate footballers in Oman
Brazilian expatriate sportspeople in Oman
Expatriate footballers in Lithuania
Brazilian expatriate sportspeople in Lithuania
Expatriate footballers in Japan
Brazilian expatriate sportspeople in Japan
Expatriate footballers in Israel
Brazilian expatriate sportspeople in Israel
Expatriate footballers in Kuwait
Brazilian expatriate sportspeople in Kuwait
Kuwait Premier League players